Challavaripalli is a small village in Kondapuram, Nellore district of the Indian state of Andhra Pradesh.

Education

MPPS Challavaripalli was established in 1968 and offers primary education for children in Challavaripalli and nearby villages.

References 

Villages in Nellore district